Radyo Nağme also known as TRT Nağme (literally "TRT tune") is a radio network of Turkish Radio and Television Corporation (TRT). This network is specialized on Turkish art music.

Technical details
TRT Nağme is broadcast both on satellite (Direct broadcast satellite, DBS) and on FM transmitters. Although there are many FM transmitter stations only those stations  which are mainly directed to province capitals are shown below.

References

Turkish radio networks
Turkish music
Turkish Radio and Television Corporation